The clouded angelshark (Squatina nebulosa) is an angelshark of the family Squatinidae found in the northwest Pacific from the southeastern Sea of Japan to Taiwan between latitudes 47° N and 22° N. Its length is up to 1.63 m.

Reproduction is ovoviviparous.

References

 
 Compagno, Dando, & Fowler, Sharks of the World, Princeton University Press, New Jersey 2005 
  Walsh JH and DA Ebert.  2007.  A review of the systematics of western North Pacific angel sharks, genus Squatina, with redescriptions of Squatina formosa, S. japonica, and S. nebulosa (Chondrichthyes: Squatiniformes, Squatinidae).  Zootaxa 1551: 31-47.

clouded angelshark
Marine fauna of East Asia
Vulnerable fauna of Asia
clouded angelshark
Taxa named by Charles Tate Regan